Yousry Nasrallah (  ) (born 26 July 1952) is an Egyptian film director.

Biography
Nasrallah was born to a Coptic Christian family in Cairo. He graduated  in economics and political science at Cairo University. Following, he worked as a film critic and directing assistant in Beirut from 1978 to 1982. He became assistant to Youssef Chahine whose company Misr International would go on to produce his films. Nasrallah's works have dealt with themes of leftism, Islamic fundamentalism, and expatriation.

His 2012 film After the Battle competed for the Palme d'Or at the 2012 Cannes Film Festival.

Films 
 Sariqat Sayfiyya (Summer Thefts) (1985).
 The Mercedes (1993).
 On Boys, Girls and the Veil (1995).
 al-Madina (The City) (1999).
 Bab el Chams (The Gate of Sun) (2003).
 Genenet al Asmak (Aquarium) (2008).
 Ehki ya shahrazade (Scheherazade Tell Me a Story) (2009).
 After the Battle (2012)
 Brooks, Meadows and Lovely Faces (2016)

References

Notes
 Shafik, V., Leaman, O. (ed.), 106, 2001, Companion Encyclopedia of Middle Eastern and North African Film, Routledge
 Yousry Nasrallah:Biography and Filmography from Cannes Film Festival.
 link to New York Times Aug. 12, 2011 review of "Scheherazade, Tell Me a Story"

Further reading
 Benjamin Geer, "Yousry Nasrallah: The Pursuit of Autonomy in the Arab and European Film Markets in: Josef Gugler (ed.), Ten Arab Filmmakers: Political Dissent and Social Critique, Indiana University Press, 2015, pp. 142–164

External links
 

1952 births
Living people
Egyptian film directors
Egyptian Copts
Arabic-language film directors